Plexin B1 is a protein of the plexin family that in humans is encoded by the PLXNB1 gene.

Function 

Within neural tissues, the plexin family serves as transmembrane receptors for Semaphorins. Outside of neural tissues, Plexin B1 is implicated in the control of cell migration.

Interactions 

PLXNB1 has been shown to interact with ARHGEF12, Rnd1 and ARHGEF11.

References 

 Chapoval SP, Hritzo M, Qi X, Tamagnone L, Golding A and Keegan AD. "Semaphorin 4A Stabilizes Human Regulatory T Cell Phenotype via Plexin B1". ImmunoHorizons,  February 1, 2019,  3  (2)  71-87;

Further reading

External links